The 2005 Sydney to Hobart Yacht Race, sponsored by Rolex, was the 61st annual running of the "blue water classic" Sydney to Hobart Yacht Race. As in past editions of the race, it was hosted by the Cruising Yacht Club of Australia based in Sydney, New South Wales. The 2005 edition began on Sydney Harbour at 1:20pm on Boxing Day (26 December 2005), before heading south for 630 nautical miles (1,170 km) through the Tasman Sea, past Bass Strait, into Storm Bay and up the River Derwent, to cross the finish line in Hobart, Tasmania.

The 2005 fleet comprised 85 starters of which 80 completed the race and five yachts retired.

Results

Line Honours results (Top 10)

Handicap results (Top 10)

References

Sydney to Hobart Yacht Race
S
2005 in Australian sport
December 2005 sports events in Australia
January 2006 sports events in Australia